Paul Edwards (born February 21, 1961) is a Manitoba politician and lawyer. He served as leader of the Manitoba Liberal Party from 1993 to 1996.

Edwards was born in Kingston, Ontario and was educated at Trent University and Queen's University. He later worked as a barrister and solicitor.

In 1988, Edwards was elected to the Legislative Assembly of Manitoba for the Winnipeg riding of St. James, defeating his closest competitor, Progressive Conservative Jae Eadie, by 579 votes. He joined 19 other Liberals in forming the official opposition to the minority government of Progressive Conservative Premier Gary Filmon.

The 1988 election was a landmark for the Manitoba Liberal Party, in that it had previously been reduced to a marginal presence in the province. The unpopularity of Howard Pawley's New Democratic government in 1988 had given the party the support of many centre-left voters, and many  believed that the Liberals had a chance to form government in the next election. This did not occur.  The New Democratic Party recovered under Gary Doer's leadership, and the Liberals were reduced to only seven seats (out of 57) in the election of 1990. Edwards was re-elected in St. James, this time defeating Progressive Conservative candidate Joanne Thibault by 295 votes.

Liberal leader Sharon Carstairs was blamed by many in the party for squandering a chance to form government, and resigned as party leader in 1993.  Subsequently, Edwards defeated MLA Kevin Lamoureux to become the party's new leader.

The Liberals initially appeared to have a reasonable chance of winning the 1995 election, placing a strong second to the Tories in early polls. They ran a poor campaign, however, and the NDP overtook them well before election day. The Liberals fell to three seats in the election of 1995: Lamoureux was re-elected in his constituency of Inkster, as were Neil Gaudry in St. Boniface and Gary Kowalski in The Maples. In another close race in St. James, Edwards lost to New Democratic candidate MaryAnn Mihychuk by 166 votes. He announced his resignation as party leader later in the year. He formally resigned in 1996, and subsequently returned to a legal practice.

Edwards is married to Anne MacKay. They have four children: Beth, Evan, Wynn and Adam.

Election results

References

1961 births
Living people
Manitoba Liberal Party MLAs
Members of the United Church of Canada
People from Kingston, Ontario
Politicians from Winnipeg
Trent University alumni